José María Álvarez (born 31 May 1942, in Cartagena, Spain), is a Spanish poet and novelist.

He studied Philosophy and Letters in the University of Murcia, Philosophy  in the Sorbonne and subsequently both History and Geography in Spanish universities.

The principal work of  Álvarez is Museo de cera (Wax Museum)  which was a work in progress for many years due to the author's endeavouring to complete a unique and all-encompassing book (un libro único y totalizador). In the most recent edition, Álvarez has finally brought the cycle to a conclusion.

He has also translated into Spanish the work of, among others, Robert Louis Stevenson, Edgar Allan Poe, Jack London, T.S. Eliot, Shakespeare, François Villon, the complete works of Constantine P. Cavafy, and the poems from the years of madness of Friedrich Hölderlin.

José María Álvarez has followed a number of the trends in contemporary Spanish poetry, passing from socially aware poetry to a culturalism deriving from his life experience. His protagonist is no revolutionary wishing to change lives, but a bon vivant, a disdainer of vulgarity, and a lover of lost causes.

His poems are often bipartite, consisting of:
 An introductory quote (allusions to cinema mythography, theatrical dialogues, fragments of novels, poems, essays, song lyrics, etc.) and
 The poem as such, which attempts to organise chaos, to explain an incomprehensible world.

Bibliography 
 1999, La lágrima de Ahab (The tear of Ahab)
 2003, Los decorados del olvido (The stage sets of oblivion), a volume of his reminiscences., a poetic work reflecting, generally in a sarcastic tone, on sex and society.

References

External Links (in Spanish) 
 CTpedia
 His personal Web Page
 Poems of José María Álvarez
 José María Álvarez in Cisne Negro (The Black Swan)
 José María Álvarez, Sobre Shakespeare (On Shakespeare) (El Gaviero Ediciones, Almería, 2005).

1942 births
Living people
University of Murcia alumni
University of Paris alumni
21st-century Spanish poets
Spanish male poets
Writers from Cartagena, Spain
Spanish expatriates in France
21st-century Spanish male writers